Kuloor  (historical name) is a village in Kasaragod district in the state of Kerala, India.the kuloor name was born in tulu language

the meaning kul (more paddy agriculture ) oor in tulu village 

kuloor have more respect in aila magane for kuloor beedu

Transportation
Local roads have access to National Highway No.66 which connects to Mangalore in the north and Calicut in the south.  The nearest railway station is Manjeshwar on Mangalore-Palakkad line. There is an airport at Mangalore. kerala state have planned to build new road connection between chigurupade to uppala in kuloor . it will be possible in 2 years.

Languages
1) Tulu

2) Malayalam

3) Konkani
 
4) Urdu

5) Kannada

SMALL AREAS IN KULOOR 
1) kuloor boodu 

2) manoor

3) chinala 

4) eliyana 

5) karippar

6) shanthinagara

7) charla

devotional places 
1) kuloor boodu

2) kuloor sthana 

3) santhadka

4) charla masjid

5) chinala juma masjid

Administration
This village is part of Manjeswaram assembly constituency which is again part of Kasaragod (Lok Sabha constituency)

References

Manjeshwar area